Washington Beltrán Barbat (February 7, 1885 – April 2, 1920) was a Uruguayan political figure and journalist.

Background and career

Originally from Tacuarembó, Beltrán moved to Montevideo and became a lawyer and a prolific journalist and writer. He co-founded the El País newspaper in 1918.

His son, Washington Beltrán Mullin, was to serve as President of Uruguay.

Deputy

Beltrán was elected to serve as a deputy and became a prominent member of the National (Blanco) Party. He was noted for his effectiveness at giving political speeches.

Death

In 1920, Washington Beltrán Barbat was killed in a pistol duel with former President of Uruguay José Batlle y Ordóñez.

See also

 Politics of Uruguay
 List of political families in Uruguay

References

1885 births
1920 deaths
People from Tacuarembó
20th-century Uruguayan lawyers
Uruguayan people of Spanish descent
National Party (Uruguay) politicians
Members of the Chamber of Representatives of Uruguay
Duelling fatalities
Deaths by firearm in Uruguay
Uruguayan duellists